Hnin Thway Yu Aung (born 24 August 1996) is a Burmese model and beauty queen, who won the 5th edition of Miss Universe Myanmar in 2018. She represented her country Myanmar in the Miss Universe 2018.

Early life
Hnin Thway Yu Aung, was born on 24 August 1996 in Meiktila, Mandalay, Myanmar as where her parents met and established an optic shop in the downtown area of Tachileik. She received her high school Diploma from Basic Education High School (1) - Tachileik, she graduated from Kyaing Tung University with a bachelor's degree in English. She can speak Burmese, English, Thai and Shan.

Pageantry

Miss Universe Myanmar
On October 1, 2017, Hnin Thway Yu Aung was crowned as Miss Universe Myanmar 2018 by previous titleholder Zun Than Sin. She will be Myanmar's next representative to Miss Universe.

Miss Universe 2018
She represented her country in the Miss Universe 2018 where Demi-Leigh Nel-Peters of South Africa crowned her successor Catriona Gray of the Philippines at the end of the event.

Filmography
Hhnin Thway Yu Aung played the role of Zin Zin / Consort Mala, Consort of King Bodawpaya in From Chao Phraya to Irrawaddy (ကျောက်ဖရားမှဧရာဝတီသို့) (2022) which increased attention and popularity with this role.

Political activities
Following the 2021 Myanmar coup d'état, Hnin Thway Yu Aung was active in the anti-coup movement through social media. She has been in Thailand since December for the filming of From Chao Phraya to Irrawaddy.
She spoke to Thai media about the current situation in Myanmar. She joined the "We Want Justice" three-finger salute movement. The movement was launched on social media, and many celebrities have joined the movement. She sold her crown for 45 lakh Burmese Kyats to donate to the Pyidaungsu Hluttaw Representative Committee (CRPH) fund.

On 3 April 2021, warrants for her arrest were issued under section 505 (a) of the penal code by the State Administration Council for speaking out against the military coup. Along with several other celebrities, she was charged with calling for participation in the Civil Disobedience Movement (CDM) and damaging the state's ability to govern, with supporting the Committee Representing Pyidaungsu Hluttaw, and with generally inciting the people to disturb the peace and stability of the nation.

References

External links
Miss Universe Myanmar

1996 births
Living people
Miss Universe 2018 contestants
People from Shan State
Miss Universe Myanmar winners
University of Yangon alumni
Burmese beauty pageant winners
Burmese people of Shan descent